Hanan H. Balkhy is a Saudi physician who currently serves as the first Assistant Director of Antimicrobial Resistance at the World Health Organization.

Early life and education
Balkhy grew up in the United States of America until six years of age. She graduated from King Abdulaziz University in Jeddah, Saudi Arabia in 1991. 

Balkhy did her pediatric residency at Massachusetts General Hospital in Boston between 1993 and 1996. She also received a fellowship in pediatric infectious diseases from the Joint Pediatric Infectious Disease Program of the Cleavland Clinic Foundation and Rainbow Babies & Children's Hospital from 1996 to 1999. During her fellowship, she worked on the immunological response of Salmonella endotoxin in mice models under the mentorship of Professor Frederick Heinzel. She worked as the Executive Director, Infection Prevention and Control at the Ministry of National Guard for 10 years.

Work
Balkhy was the leader of the infectious diseases research department at King Abdullah International Research Centre at King Saud bin Abdulaziz University for Health Sciences in Riyadh, Saudi Arabia. She was the editor-in-chief of the Journal of Infection and Public Health from 2009-2019, and has over 200 publications. 

At the World Health Organization, Balkhy is a member of several committees related to antimicrobial resistance, including the UN Interagency Coordination Group on Antimicrobial Resistance (IACG). She is a fellow at the European Society of Clinical Microbiology and Infectious Diseases (ESCMID).

References

See also
 Google Scholar Profile of Hanan H. Balkhy
 WHO Profile of Hanan H. Balkhy

Saudi Arabian pediatricians
Year of birth missing (living people)
World Health Organization officials